Gabriel Afolayan,  (born 1 March 1985) also known by his musical stage name G-Fresh, is a Nigerian actor and singer.

Education 
He studied theatre arts at the University of Ibadan.

Career 
He is part of the renowned Afolayan entertainment family that comprises Ade Love, Moji Afolayan, Kunle Afolayan and Aremu Afolayan. As an actor, he won the Best Supporting Actor award for playing "Tavier Jambari" in Hoodrush (2012). As a musician, he is known mostly for "Awelewa" and "Kokoro Ife". In an interview with The Punch, he described his musical genre as "Love ballad". Afolayan's acting debut was in F Opawon by Baba Sala. In an interview with Nigerian Tribune, he stated that his music career started in 1997, while he was part of a group in Ibadan. He also stated that he has always been part of the choir. He has cited 2face, Banky W., Aṣa and Bez as influences.

He rose to fame, playing the role “Akin” in a Super Story Series titled NNENNA.

Personal life
Afolayan is the son of the Nigerian entertainment icon Adeyemi Afolayan popularly known as "Ade love".

Filmography
King Invincible
Code Wilo
Gold Statue
Ojuju
Madam Dearest
Ija Okan
Hoodrush
Heroes and Zeros
7 Inch Curve
Okafor's Law
Citation (film)
Closet (TV Series)
Kasala
Tatu
Tomi has a gun
 Nnenna
Gone
Coming from Insanity
For Maria Ebun Pataki
Blood Sisters
Flawsome

Discography
"Kokoro Ife"
"Plug it"
"Kpasi Kona"
"Awelewa"
"Kokoro Ife"

Awards

See also
List of Yoruba people

References

External links

Nigerian male singer-songwriters
Nigerian singer-songwriters
Nigerian male stage actors
Nigerian male film actors
University of Ibadan alumni
Male actors from Ibadan
Best Supporting Actor Africa Movie Academy Award winners
Yoruba male actors
21st-century Nigerian male actors
21st-century Nigerian singers
Yoruba musicians
Male actors in Yoruba cinema
Yoruba-language singers
Living people
Gabriel
1985 births
Nigerian male television actors
Nigerian songwriters
Nigerian film award winners